Thomas Highflyer (1858 – 20 June 1870) was a former slave who was born in East Africa and who later lived and died in Brighton.

Rescue
He was one of 152 Africans found on an Arabian ship off the coast of Zanzibar on August 24, 1866 by HMS Highflyer. He and several other boys were put to work on HMS Highflyer, with Thomas working as a valet before disembarking in Brighton in 1868. He was named Thomas Malcolm Sabine Highflyer after ship captain Thomas Malcolm Sabine Paisley.

Life in Brighton
He lived in a lodging house in Great College Street, Kemp Town, with Henry and Eliza Thompson, who wanted him to be educated. He attended St. Mark's School in Whitehawk, where the headmaster encouraged other pupils to welcome him. He attended All Souls Church, near Kemp Town, which was the first church built by Reverend Henry Wagner. His life story was told in a book dedicated to teaching young people about Christianity and how the word of God was spread across the globe to such lands ad Africa and India.

Death
In 1870 he succumbed to tuberculosis and dropsy.

Grave
He was buried in Woodvale Cemetery.
Bert Williams, co-founder of Brighton and Hove Black History, said: "The English climate didn’t suit him. But you can tell by the expensive gravestone at Woodvale that he was loved. He was treated like a son by Mrs Thompson."

In January 2018 his gravestone was removed for restoration work. In June 2018 a ceremony was held to lay a new gravestone for him. The ceremony included pupils from Thomas' former school, Bert Williams, president of Brighton and Hove Black History, and Paul Campbell, a representative of the council.

References

External links
Tom Highflyer - Brighton and Hove Black History

1858 births
1870 deaths
Former slaves
19th-century African people
Arabian slaves and freedmen
Slave trade in Zanzibar